Marcos Arouca da Silva (born 11 August 1986), commonly known as Arouca, is a Brazilian professional footballer who plays as a defensive midfielder for Figueirense.

Club career

Fluminense
Born in Duas Barras, Arouca made his professional debuts with Fluminense in 2004 Brasileirão, appearing 10 times. In the following year he appeared regularly with the side, and scored his first professional goal on 25 September 2005, netting his side's first of a 4–3 home success over Santos.

In 2007 Arouca played regularly during the Copa do Brasil winning campaign, and also appeared in 30 matches in the league with Flu finishing fourth. In the following year he was again starter, also being runner-up of that year's Copa Libertadores. In September 2008 he completed 200 matches for Fluminense, finishing the season with 54 appearances overall.

São Paulo
On 23 December 2008 Arouca agreed a five-year deal with São Paulo. He made his debut for Tricolor on 21 January 2009, coming on as a second-half substitute in a 1–1 home draw against Ituano.

However, Arouca served only as a backup to Hernanes and Richarlyson in his only season, and only started in 25 of the 40 matches played in 2009.

Santos

On 19 January 2010 Arouca joined Santos in an on-year loan deal, with Rodrigo Souto moving in the opposite direction. He made his debut for the club late in the month, playing the last 28 minutes in a 2–0 home win over Oeste. As a starter, Arouca was a key defensive unit in that year's Copa do Brasil and Paulista winning campaigns. On 23 July 2010 Santos bought him outright, signing a four-year deal for a €3.5 million fee.

In the following year Arouca was again ever-present, scoring his first goal for Peixe on 15 May 2011, netting the first of a 2–1 home success over Corinthians, in 2011 Campeonato Paulista final. He was also starter during the Copa Libertadores and FIFA Club World Cup, which Santos finished champions and runner-up, respectively; Arouca also assisted Neymar in the first goal of the Libertadores' final.

Arouca was again an ever-present figure during 2012, winning his third consecutive Paulistão, also scoring his second goal for Santos on 29 February, against Guarani. On 23 August 2013 he renewed his link with Peixe, running until the end of 2016.

In March 2014, Arouca was racially abused by the crowd in a state championship game against Mogi Mirim. The abuse was condemned by the nation's president Dilma Rousseff, who invited Arouca to meet her at the Palácio do Planalto along with two others who had suffered similarly, Cruzeiro player Tinga and gaúcho referee Márcio Chagas.

On 9 January 2015 Arouca took a legal action against Santos due to unpaid wages, despite previously stating that he would not make such action; on the 29th, after lengthy negotiations, he rescinded his link with the club and removed his legal action, with Santos also retaining 40% of his rights.

Palmeiras
One day after rescinding with Santos, Arouca signed a four-year deal with Palmeiras.

International career
After appearing with Brazil under-17 and under-20's squads, Arouca made his debut with the main squad on 7 September 2012, coming on as a late substitute in a 1–0 success over South Africa.

Despite the call ups and playing in four games, Arouca failed to impress in his performances with the national squad and as a result, he never solidified a position within the team; he was left out of the squad after the replacement of the former coach Mano Menezes by Luiz Felipe Scolari.

Career statistics

Honours

Club
Fluminense
 Rio de Janeiro State League: 2005
 Copa do Brasil: 2007

Santos
 Campeonato Paulista: 2010, 2011, 2012
 Copa do Brasil: 2010
 Copa Libertadores: 2011
 Recopa Sudamericana: 2012

Palmeiras
 Copa do Brasil: 2015
 Campeonato Brasileiro Série A: 2016

Individual
 Campeonato Paulista Team of the year: 2010, 2014, 2015

References

External links
  
 Arouca at playmakerstats.com (English version of ogol.com.br)
 

1986 births
Living people
Sportspeople from Rio de Janeiro (state)
Brazilian footballers
Association football midfielders
Fluminense FC players
São Paulo FC players
Santos FC players
Sociedade Esportiva Palmeiras players
Clube Atlético Mineiro players
Campeonato Brasileiro Série A players
Brazil youth international footballers
Brazil under-20 international footballers
Brazil international footballers